The Aichi AB-6, or Aichi Experimental 7-Shi Reconnaissance Seaplane, was a prototype Japanese reconnaissance floatplane. It was a single-engined, three-seat biplane intended for the Imperial Japanese Navy, but only one was built, the rival aircraft from Kawanishi, the E7K being preferred.

Design and development

In 1932, the Imperial Japanese Navy raised a specification for a long-range floatplane reconnaissance aircraft to replace its Yokosuka E1Y and E5Y operating from its seaplane tenders and  battleships, requesting prototypes from Aichi and Kawanishi.  Aichi's entry, the Aichi AB-6 or  Aichi Experimental 7-Shi Reconnaissance Seaplane, designed by Tetsuo Miki, was based on the Heinkel He 62, one example of which had been imported by Aichi the previous year for evaluation against a similar requirement.  The AB-6 was a biplane with folding wings for storage aboard ship, of all-metal construction with fabric covering, and powered by a single Hiro Type 91 W12 engine.  Its crew of three, pilot, observer and radio operator/gunner were accommodated in an enclosed cockpit.

Operational history

The prototype was completed in February 1933 and made its maiden flight from Nagoya harbor. While it had good handling in the air, its speed, take-off, and landing performance was disappointing, and the aircraft was modified to try to improve matters.  It was fitted with revised wings, of different aerofoil section and with full-span leading edge slats.  The original Hamilton-Standard two-bladed metal variable-pitch propeller was first replaced by a two-bladed wooden propeller and then a four-bladed wooden unit.  Despite these changes, Kawanishi's design remained superior, and in 1934, was ordered into production as the Navy Type 94 Reconnaissance Seaplane, or Kawanishi E7K.

Specifications (final configuration)

See also

Notes
 In the Japanese Navy designation system, specifications were given a Shi number based on the year of the Emperor's reign it was issued.  In this case 7-Shi stood for 1932, the 7th year of the Shōwa era.

References

Francillon, R.J. Japanese Aircraft of the Pacific War. London:Putnam, 1970. .
Mikesh, Robert and Shorzoe Abe. Japanese Aircraft 1910–1941. London:Putnam, 1990. .

1930s Japanese military reconnaissance aircraft
Floatplanes
AB-6
Biplanes
Single-engined tractor aircraft
Aircraft first flown in 1933